Ruidosa is an unincorporated desert village in Presidio County, Texas, United States. Although called a ghost town by some sources, there were 43 inhabitants as of 2000 and a small store.

Education
Ruidosa is incorporated into the Presidio Independent School District.

Climate
This area has a large amount of sunshine year round due to its stable descending air and high pressure.  According to the Köppen climate classification system, Ruidosa has a desert climate, abbreviated as BWh on climate maps.

References

External links
 

Unincorporated communities in Presidio County, Texas
Unincorporated communities in Texas